In Turkic mythology, Abzar iyesi (Old Turkic: 𐰀𐰉𐰔𐰀𐰺 𐰄𐰖𐰅𐰽𐰄) is a household spirit. It is the protector spirit of courtyard. (The word "İye" means owner, master or possessor) Lives in the garden or courtyard of house.

Features
Abzar iyesi is the Turkic spirit of the courtyard. It was associated with a farmstead's grounds, cattle shed, and stable. It is similar to the house spirit Ev iyesi, though it was less benevolent. Abzar iyesi was considered more dangerous than Ev iyesi as it could pose a threat to livestock, particularly animals with white fur. It can turn into ("shapeshifting") an animal form, especially a pet.

Abzar Ana
Abzar Ana is female form of Abzar iyesi. It has also been said that Abzar Ana can take on the appearance of cats or dogs. The actions performed by Abzar Ana vaguely resemble those of poltergeists and are not necessarily harmful.

Abzar Ata
Abzar Ata is male form of Abzar iyesi. Tatar folklore says that an Abzar iyesi could harass horses in the stable overnight, as well as steal the grain of a neighbour to feed his own horses.

See also
 Dvorovoi

References

External links 
  Tatar Mitolojisinde Varlıklar, Çulpan Zaripova (Abzar İyäse, Mal İyäse, Ahır İyesi, Mal İyesi)
  Türk Mitoloji Sözlüğü, Pınar Karaca (Abzar İyase)
  Mifinaradov - Мифы народов мира / Онлайн энциклопедия (Abzar İyesi)

Turkish folklore
İye